Neubeuern is a municipality  in the district of Rosenheim in Bavaria in Germany. It lies on the river Inn.

History

Neubeuern was first mentioned in a document in 788.
Since the 12th century, there has been a castle in Neubeuern, which is now Castle Neubeuern. During the Nazi era, the castle was a National Socialist political special school. Today there is a residential school in the castle.
From May 1942 until the fall of Nazi Germany, Neubeuern was the site of a National Political Institute of Education.

References

Rosenheim (district)
Populated places on the Inn (river)